Leeland may refer to:

Places
Leeland, Virginia
Leeland, Maryland
Leeland, Nevada

Other uses
Leeland (band), an American Christian rock band
Leeland (given name), includes a list of people with the name

See also
 Leeland station (disambiguation)
 Leland (disambiguation)
 Leyland (disambiguation)
 Leelan, village in Faisalabad, Punjab, Pakistan
 Leelanau (disambiguation)